is the 19th major single released by Kotoko. The title track was used as the opening theme for the iOS/Android game Renai Replay. The B-side was used as the ending theme song for the same game. The single reached No. 37 on the Oricon charts and charted for 4 weeks.

Track listing 

2012 singles
Kotoko (singer) songs
2012 songs

ja:リスタート (KOTOKOの曲)